José Santiago Cañizares Ruiz (born 18 December 1969) is a Spanish former footballer who played as a goalkeeper, currently a rally driver.

A product of Real Madrid's youth academies, he eventually joined the first team but proved unable to establish himself there, being loaned out twice. He moved to Valencia in 1998, appearing in 418 official matches over the next decade and winning several major titles, including two La Liga championships and the 2004 UEFA Cup.

Cañizares represented Spain in three World Cups and as many European Championships, and won a gold medal at the 1992 Summer Olympics. In 2004, Peter Schmeichel said that he regarded him as the "finest goalkeeper in world football".

Club career
Born in Madrid but raised in Puertollano, Castile-La Mancha from where his parents hailed, Cañizares started his career with Real Madrid in 1988, playing initially with its C-team. He started professionally with Elche CF, CP Mérida and RC Celta de Vigo, making his first La Liga appearance with the Galicians in the 1992–93 season, missing only two league games during his tenure and subsequently returning to Real Madrid.

Unable to cement a starting place, his best output being 26 matches during 1997–98 (but he lost his place in the final part of the year to Bodo Illgner, thus missing the 1998 Champions League final), Cañizares moved to Valencia CF in 1998 to replace the retired Andoni Zubizarreta. He helped the club to win the Spanish Cup and Supercup finals in 1999, also reaching consecutive UEFA Champions League finals (2000 and 2001, saving a penalty from FC Bayern Munich's Mehmet Scholl in normal time of an eventual penalty shootout defeat in the latter edition) and winning national championships in 2002 and 2004, adding the UEFA Cup and Supercup 2004 finals; following the latter campaign, the 34-year-old renewed his contract with the Che for a further two years.

In December 2007 Cañizares, alongside teammates Miguel Ángel Angulo and David Albelda, was axed by manager Ronald Koeman, with all three players limited to training and unable to join another side in Spain, having already played four league games. In late April 2008, however, with Koeman's sacking, all three were reinstated by new coach Voro in a squad seriously threatened with relegation, with five rounds remaining; he returned to action on 27 April 2008 as Timo Hildebrand and Juan Luis Mora were injured, in a 3–0 home win against CA Osasuna.

On 16 May 2008, Cañizares agreed to end his contract with Valencia and leave the club. He played his final game two days later against Atlético Madrid, retiring shortly after at almost 39 years of age and having appeared in exactly 500 league matches – both major levels combined – during exactly two decades.

International career
Cañizares was capped 46 times for Spain, the first on 17 November 1993: Zubizarreta was sent off in the tenth minute of a decisive 1994 FIFA World Cup qualifier against Denmark, and he made his debut in heroic fashion, keeping a clean sheet in the 1–0 home win and ensuring qualification at the expense of the Danes themselves.

However, Cañizares was often second choice, and only played five games in the major international scene: one in the 1994 World Cup (as Zubi served a one-match ban), three in UEFA Euro 2000 and one in the 2006 World Cup. He was also a squad member at Euro 1996, the 1998 World Cup and Euro 2004 but did not play, blocked by Zubizarreta in the 1990s and Iker Casillas in 2004; he was equally an unused player in the gold winning squad at the 1992 Summer Olympics in Barcelona, where Toni Jiménez appeared in all matches.

Cañizares' club form ensured himself starter status in the 2002 World Cup, but he missed out on the tournament due to an accident with an aftershave bottle, which resulted in a severed tendon in his foot. He was also in Spain's squad at the 2006 FIFA World Cup, making his only appearance in Germany and last in his international career in the last group match, a 1–0 victory over Saudi Arabia in Kaiserslautern.

Rallying career
In October 2010, Cañizares competed for the first time in a scoring event for the Spanish Rally Championship, driving a Suzuki Swift with co-driver Dani Cué in the Sierra Morena Rally. The following year, with the same car and the same partner, he was part of the Suzuki Ibérica Motor Sport team.

During a session in the 2016 Sierra Morena Rally, Cañizares crashed his vehicle after attempting to break coming into a bend. He eventually emerged unharmed from the accident.

On 17 June 2017, Cañizares earned his first victory by winning the Rally de la Cerámica with a Porsche 997. Later that year, he was crowned Valencian Community champion.

Post-retirement and personal life

After retiring, Cañizares worked as a commentator. He fathered seven children from his two marriages, including triplets with his second wife Mayte García.

On 23 March 2018, Cañizares announced the death of his five-year-old son Santi due to cancer. In 2019, he was subjected to controversy after making disapproving comments on the circumstances of José Antonio Reyes' death; following immediate social media backlash, he issued a more compassionate statement of clarification.

On 16 October 2020, it was reported that Cañizares' son Lucas would be included in the squad list of Real Madrid for a league match against Cádiz CF.

Career statistics

Club

International

Honours
Real Madrid
La Liga: 1994–95, 1996–97
Supercopa de España: 1997
UEFA Champions League: 1997–98

Valencia
La Liga: 2001–02, 2003–04
Copa del Rey: 1998–99
Supercopa de España: 1999; runner-up 2002, 2004
UEFA Cup: 2003–04
UEFA Super Cup: 2004
UEFA Intertoto Cup: 1998
UEFA Champions League runner-up: 1999–2000, 2000–01

Spain U16
UEFA European Under-16 Championship: 1986

Spain U23
Summer Olympic Games: 1992

Individual
Ricardo Zamora Trophy: 1992–93 (shared), 2000–01, 2001–02, 2003–04
UEFA Team of the Year: 2001

See also
List of La Liga players (400+ appearances)
List of Valencia CF players (+100 appearances)

References

External links

CiberChe biography and stats 

1969 births
Living people
Footballers from Madrid
Spanish footballers
Association football goalkeepers
La Liga players
Segunda División players
Tercera División players
Real Madrid C footballers
Real Madrid Castilla footballers
Real Madrid CF players
Elche CF players
CP Mérida footballers
RC Celta de Vigo players
Valencia CF players
UEFA Champions League winning players
UEFA Cup winning players
Spain youth international footballers
Spain under-21 international footballers
Spain under-23 international footballers
Spain international footballers
1994 FIFA World Cup players
UEFA Euro 1996 players
1998 FIFA World Cup players
UEFA Euro 2000 players
UEFA Euro 2004 players
2006 FIFA World Cup players
Footballers at the 1992 Summer Olympics
Olympic footballers of Spain
Olympic medalists in football
Olympic gold medalists for Spain
Medalists at the 1992 Summer Olympics
Spanish rally drivers